The Operative: No One Lives Forever (abbreviated as NOLF) is a first-person shooter video game with stealth gameplay elements, developed by Monolith Productions and published by Fox Interactive, released for Windows in 2000. The game was ported later to the PlayStation 2 and Mac OS X in 2002.

A story-driven game set in the 1960s, No One Lives Forever has been critically acclaimed for its stylistic representation of the era in the spirit of many spy films and television series of that decade, as well as for its humor. Players control female protagonist Cate Archer, who works for a secret organization that watches over world peace. In addition to a range of firearms, the game contains several gadgets disguised as ordinary female fashion items.

At the time of its release, many reviewers felt that No One Lives Forever was the best first-person shooter since 1998's Half-Life. After receiving several Game of the Year awards in the press, a special Game of the Year Edition was released in 2001, which included an additional mission. The Operative: No One Lives Forever was followed by a sequel, No One Lives Forever 2: A Spy in H.A.R.M.'s Way, in 2002, and a spin-off that takes place during the time between the first two games entitled Contract J.A.C.K. released in 2003, both developed by Monolith.

A re-release of the game has been hampered by the complicated state of the series' intellectual property (IP) rights, with even parties assumed to be in possession of the IP having publicly admitted not knowing the precise legal situation of the series.

Gameplay
The Operative: No One Lives Forever is a story-driven video game, set in the 1960s, and stars spy Cate Archer as the eponymous Operative, who works for UNITY—a secret international organization "dedicated to protecting humanity from megalomaniacs bent upon world domination." During the story of the game, Archer is sent on missions to a number of locales, including Morocco, East and West Germany, the Caribbean, and the Alps, where she gets into intense situations, such as scuba diving a shipwreck, free-falling from an airplane without a parachute, and exploring a space station in outer space, all the while fighting armed villains.

The game is a mixture of a first-person shooter and a stealth game. Most, but not all, missions can be solved in multiple ways: using sneaking to avoid danger or by going in with guns blazing. A stealthy approach can be taken to evade security cameras, guard dogs and other obstacles. Enemies are aware of noise made by the player, including footsteps and weapon fire, and they also react to footprints in the snow, and dead bodies left lying around. The game features a wide variety of firearms, including a semi-automatic pistol, a revolver, a submachine gun, a sniper rifle, and an assault rifle. Some of the weapons can be loaded with different types of ammunition, including standard full metal jacket bullets, dum dum rounds that expand on impact and cause bleeding damage, and phosphorus-coated tracer bullets that continue to burn upon impact. Silencers and scopes can also be fitted on some weapons.

A novel feature of the game is its array of gadgets, often disguised as ordinary female fashion objects. For example, lipsticks double as various explosives, perfume bottles hold materials such as sleeping gas, a barrette also functions as a lockpick and poison dagger, sunglasses can be used for photographing evidence and detecting land mines, and a belt buckle hides a zip line inside it. Other gadgets include a body-removing powder for disposing of incriminating corpses, a robotic poodle to distract guard dogs, and a rocket launcher disguised as a briefcase. An ordinary coin can be thrown to confuse enemies, giving the player the opportunity to sneak by without a guard noticing. A cigarette lighter can also be used as a miniature welding torch. These ingenious gadgets come from UNITY's gadget lab, led by its main inventor and scientist, Santa. "Santa's Workshop" continuously works on these covert gadgets and provides Cate with them as the game progresses.

In various sections of the game, the player can ride a motorcycle, or a snowmobile. Other segments of the game involve boss fights. If the player chooses to be stealthy, they can overhear humorous conversations between non-player characters, such as guards, scientists and civilians. Occasionally, the player can engage in conversations with such characters. In certain cutscenes, the game uses a dialog tree, where the player can choose between different questions and responses when talking to another character.

The missions in the game are littered with "intelligence items": briefcases, envelopes, and manila folders containing textual notes which often provide humorous side-notes and helpful hints to the game. The collection of intelligence items is optional. Special power-ups, called "gear" items are also available for collection during the game, such as "fuzzy slippers" that reduce noise made by movement, earplugs that reduce damage from explosions, and a fire extinguisher that protects the player from burn damage. These gear items are sometimes located in hard-to-reach areas. At the start of each mission, the player can choose which weapons, gadgets and gear to take with them. Some intelligence and gear items cannot be collected on the first playthrough of the game, as the necessary gadgets to reach them are not unlocked until later in the game. If the player wants to collect these items, they have to revisit the mission with the appropriate equipment.

At the end of each mission, the game displays various statistics, as well as any awards and bonuses earned during the mission. Awards are humorous textual notes given for the player's performance during a mission; these include awards for using a very low or a very high number of bullets, or a "Thanks For Not Getting Hurt Award" for avoiding damage. The player also receives a rank, such as "Trainee" or "Super Spy", which is based on the number of intelligence items obtained during the mission. Achieving a high mission rank increases the player's maximum health, armor and ammo capacity, as well as stealth, the amount of inflicted damage, and the accuracy of their shots.

No One Lives Forever also includes multiplayer gameplay online or over a local area network. There are two multiplayer modes available: standard deathmatch, and "H.A.R.M. vs. UNITY". The latter is a team deathmatch mode, where the goal is to capture as much intelligence for a player's team as possible, by sneaking in to the enemy team's base, finding the item, and photographing it.

Plot

Story
UNITY is a secret international organization headquartered somewhere in England that protects humanity from outsiders who want to take over the world. In 1967, over half of the UNITY's elite agents are murdered by an unknown assassin within a week, leaving UNITY with a critical manpower shortage. They are forced to send UNITY agent Cate Archer and her mentor, Bruno Lawrie, on a series of high-profile missions. Cate is an ex-cat burglar, and is UNITY's first female spy operative. UNITY's leaders, Jones and Smith, are skeptical of Cate working as a field agent, and have previously relegated her to more mundane assignments. Intelligence reveals that a Russian assassin named Dmitrij Volkov and a new terrorist organization named H.A.R.M. are responsible for the murders of UNITY's former agents. Cate and Bruno embark on a dangerous assignment in Morocco, which later turns out to be an ambush set up by Volkov and his men. Cate manages to escape Morocco whilst Bruno is shot by Volkov. In the UNITY headquarters, Jones and Smith reveal that Volkov killed Bruno simply because he was the traitor, to which Cate reacts with disbelief.

She is then tasked to escort Dr. Otto Schenker, an East German scientist, to England. Later on, as Cate and Dr. Schenker fly back to England, he is captured by H.A.R.M., led by Magnus Armstrong, who knocks Cate unconscious. Armstrong decides to spare Cate's life, believing that she is a fellow Scot. Cate awakens and is soon thrown from the plane as it explodes. After surviving the fall via parachute, Cate is later introduced to a new partner, Tom Goodman, a UNITY agent from the American branch. After meeting him in a nightclub in Hamburg, they are ambushed by H.A.R.M. but manage to escape. The nightclub is owned by a German singer named Inge Wagner, whom Cate suspects is connected with H.A.R.M. The two are then tasked to investigate a cargo freighter containing several suspicious chemical containers that UNITY believes are linked to Dr. Schenker. Cate gets in the freighter, and after taking photos of the containers, is knocked unconscious by Armstrong, who spares her life by locking her in a cargo hold, thus ignoring Wagner's insistence that she must be liquidated. As the freighter heads out to sea, it slowly begins to sink, due to a huge explosion. Wagner and Armstrong escape immediately, but Cate has to fight her way out of the bowels of the freighter. Because Cate could not obtain the required information, she and Tom must return to the sunken freighter to finish gathering intelligence aboard. Cate goes scuba diving, and after investigating the shipwreck and obtaining the captain's log and the cargo manifest, she is ambushed by H.A.R.M. divers sent from a submarine commanded by Armstrong and Wagner but manages to escape.

Later, Cate finds out about a connection between H.A.R.M. and a large manufacturing firm named Dumas Industrial Enterprises, which was operated by Baron Archibald Dumas. However, the Baron claims he has no intelligence regarding his connection to H.A.R.M.

Later, Cate infiltrates the Dumas corporate headquarters, gaining access to their highly guarded safe, and photographing some relevant documents, despite heavy opposition, including an ear-splitting deathmatch against Wagner. However, after photographing the headquarter's final document, Cate escapes the headquarters despite witnessing Tom being shot by Volkov.

Meanwhile, H.A.R.M. starts infecting and killing innocent people using Dr. Schenker's biological explosive development. The chemical is injected into the living host, and it feeds on organic material until it culminates in a massive explosion. H.A.R.M. states that if their ransom demands are not met, they will continue to use human time bombs to cause destruction around the world. Cate embarks on a train ride to Washington, where Dr. Schenker is believed to be located. Cate finds him and manages to escort him to safety using an underground base.

Soon after, Dr. Schenker reveals that the antidote for the chemical reagent is located in H.A.R.M.'s space station. Cate travels to a small island located in the Caribbean, where she infiltrates a secret space launch facility. Cate discovers that a rocket will be sent to the space station that afternoon to collect some antidote. Disguised as a H.A.R.M. space agent, Cate boards the rocket and travels to H.A.R.M.'s space station. While she is searching for the antidote, the space station is struck by a meteor shower, causing it to implode. Cate obtains a large antidote sample and uses an escape pod to return to Earth safely.

Now in possession of the antidote, UNITY needs the list of infected people to find out who administered it, during which Cate believes that the real mastermind behind H.A.R.M.'s events is the Baron's wife, Baroness Felicity Dumas, who is believed to be in possession of the list. Later, Cate heads to the Dumas' château located in the German Alps. While there, she is knocked unconscious by Armstrong, who spares her life by locking her in a cell. The Baroness gloats at Cate about her plans to take over the world and leaves. Cate then provokes Armstrong into an ensuing fist fight. After being defeated, Armstrong agrees to let Cate go, and defects H.A.R.M. by telling her where the list is located. Cate then realizes that she was infected after being shot with a blowgun by Wagner in Hamburg days ago. The Baroness mentions that Wagner must have set the count-down to 10 days instead of 10 hours. Eventually, Cate obtains another antidote and later, the list located in the Baroness's hidden lair.

When Cate traveled down the mountain via a gondola lift, defeating the H.A.R.M. helicopters in the process, she encounters Volkov and a gun duel ensues. During their duel, an explosion causes an avalanche to send Volkov over the edge of a cliff. Later, Cate is confronted by the Baroness, and another gun duel ensues. After defeating the Baroness, she reveals that she has also infected herself and is about to detonate. Cate hurries to clear the civilians off the streets, and hides inside a building as the Baroness explodes.

Back at UNITY's headquarters, Cate is congratulated for a mission well done, and everybody leaves to grab some rest. Cate arrives at a graveyard where Bruno was buried to pay her respects. She is then confronted by the supposedly long-dead Tom Goodman, who reveals that he is the real traitor within UNITY, and a final gun duel ensues. Cate manages to injure Tom and arrest him, but Smith shoots Tom, causing him to fall into a freshly dug grave. Smith then tries to shoot Cate as well, but Jones shoots Smith and reveals that Bruno is still alive. Smith attempts his one last effort to shoot Cate, but Cate kills Smith just in time. With Tom and Smith shot dead, Jones and Bruno decide to tell Cate the truth; Bruno falsified his death so that Cate and the rest of UNITY could find the real traitor. Seven years ago, Smith was taken out of the field by UNITY due to his inadequate fieldwork. In order to sabotage UNITY as a way to avenge himself, Smith joins H.A.R.M. to kill the real Tom Goodman, and replace him with an impostor. When Cate's investigation initially foiled H.A.R.M.'s plan, both Smith and his mole were forced to reveal their true intentions. Cate reacts in shock upon finding out the truth.

In a post-credits scene, it is revealed that Volkov survived the avalanche and reports back to H.A.R.M.'s mysterious Director, a middle-aged drunk man who Cate has seen several times in different countries during the game.

Production

Development
Work on No One Lives Forever started in 1998, after the release of Monolith Productions' previous game, Shogo: Mobile Armor Division. Craig Hubbard, game designer for Shogo and NOLF expressed that Shogo "(although critically successful) fell embarrassingly short of  original design goals", and "it is a grim reminder of the perils of wild optimism and unchecked ambition" exercised by the relatively small development team. The team (which included approximately 18 core members during development of NOLF) was determined not to make the same mistakes again with their next game. Describing the pressure on Monolith, Hubbard said that they "were still trying to live down the stigma" of their 1998 game, Blood II: The Chosen, which had been prematurely released buggy and unpolished, and that the company "had a lot to prove, both to ourselves and the gaming public."

Signing a contract with a publisher was a very difficult task for Monolith. Development had been going on for months, and the project had been approved by different publishers four times, before they were able to actually sign a deal with one. During this long time for finding a publishing partner, No One Lives Forever "mutated constantly in order to please prospective producers and marketing departments. The game actually started off as a mission-based, anime-inspired, paramilitary action thriller intended as a spiritual sequel to Shogo and ended up as a 60s spy adventure in the tradition of Our Man Flint and countless other 60s spy movies and shows." This final theme for the game was settled on through discussions with Fox Interactive, the final publisher of NOLF. (Parts of the initial "paramilitary action thriller" concept evolved into F.E.A.R., another Monolith game, released after the NOLF series, in 2005.) Monolith's producer for the game, Samantha Ryan, said that before the deal was signed, "here was a period where Monolith was two weeks from death. And Jace Hall closed the deal with Fox Interactive that basically saved the company."

After finally signing a contract with Fox (with whom partnership was announced to the public on August 24, 1999), the team was able to draft a mission statement, which stood as a point of reference during every aspect of developing the game.

The game was announced at the 1999 E3 conference show. While at this time – as described in the mission statement above – the game was already set out to be a spy-themed shooter set in the 1960s, the version that was previewed to the press at this time had many differences to the finished product, with regard to characters, plot and setting. The game's protagonist was originally set out to be a male character called Adam Church who worked for MI0, "Her Majesty's Most Secret Service". However, many of the final gameplay and story elements are known to have been present in this earlier iteration of the game: the H.A.R.M. organization; the defection of an East German biophysicist for information about a top-secret Soviet weapons program; the presence of humor in the game; some locations, such as the sunken cargo freighter; the use of gadgets, such as the rocket-launching briefcase; etc.

By at least July 1999, Monolith has decided to introduce many major changes to the game; the main reason being that the gaming press unexpectedly started comparing the game to James Bond games, like GoldenEye 007 (1997). Hubbard mentioned that their intention was to "make a 60s spy game", and claimed that they "didn't want to make a 'Bond' style game, so when people were obviously drawing that comparison, we decided to rework things a bit. We wanted to get away from the Bond comparisons that people were making, so we've changed the main character and the back-story a fair amount." As a result, the player controls a female protagonist in the final game, Cate Archer, who works for an organization called UNITY. Changing the main character to a woman not only helped the separation of the game from the Bond franchise, but also allowed for "more interesting dramatic possibilities", and the "list of gadgets got a lot more visually interesting". As Hubbard said, before switching to a female protagonist, he had been "struggling with trying to distinguish him from all the other male superspies from the era—extraordinarily handsome, intelligent, knowledgeable, resourceful, and so on. But a woman with those same characteristics immediately stood out because of the social climate of the time. No matter how qualified she might be, she'd have to overcome some serious barriers just to get a chance to prove herself. And if things didn't go flawlessly on a mission, she'd catch more heat than she deserved."

The female protagonist "went through numerous concept sketches, costume designs, hairstyles, names, and even nationalities." According to Hubbard, it was a challenge to find a look for her that was not only evocative of era, "but also worked as a 3D model." In the end, the in-game model of Cate Archer was styled after model and actress Mitzi Martin. This was a marketing decision made by the publisher, Fox Interactive, which used its feature film casting department to look for an appropriate model internationally. Archer's voice was provided by American voice actress Kit Harris, who also did the voice of the Inge Wagner character. Originally, Harris recorded the Scottish protagonist's voice in a stronger Scottish accent. This was changed after a Scottish producer of the game felt that the particular accent used was too lower class, and an inappropriate choice; Harris re-recorded her lines with a "British bent" instead. Both the face and the voice of the character were changed in the game's sequel, where she was voiced by Jen Taylor.

Along with the character and plot changes, it was also decided to change the game's working title, No One Lives Forever, to something else, for similar reasons related to the Bond franchise (in particular, the novel Nobody Lives for Ever), as well as possible legal considerations. However, the title instead stayed consistent throughout development, and "The Operative" (referring to the game's heroine, Cate Archer), which was added to the beginning of the title, was removed for the sequel, No One Lives Forever 2: A Spy in H.A.R.M.'s Way.

After the game's release, Hubbard identified the realistic expectations set by the team as a strong point in the game's development, saying that "given our budget, team size, and development cycle, the best we could hope to do was to create a fun, engaging 60s espionage game that would make up in presentation what it lacked in innovation." Other positive aspects of the process included the aforementioned mission statement, along with the flexible systems used in development, the cohesion of the team, and effective scheduling. On the other hand, Hubbard cited difficulties in fleshing out the final team, as well as inefficient pre-production, delays due to waiting on technology, and the major difficulties in finding a publisher. Hubbard also mentioned the cinematic cutscenes as lengthy and problematic, partly because of technical difficulties, and partly because of conceptual flaws on his behalf, with regard to screenwriting. Regarding gameplay, he said that "ne of the main failings of NOLF  was that it ended up feeling a lot more scripted and linear than it was intended to be". Hubbard also expressed dissatisfaction with the balance between action and intrigue: "Unfortunately, we came up a little short on intrigue. Stealth was too unforgiving. Once you were spotted, you were playing an action game." The team paid attention to these points while developing No One Lives Forever 2.

According to Hubbard, the team's "greatest asset was  the list of mistakes we made during Shogo. We started this project with a pretty sober view of what we could achieve. As a result, every major feature we outlined made it into the game, as well as a few additional items we came up with during the project." However, there were still things that the team didn't have enough time to implement. For example, No One Lives Forever'''s team-based multiplayer portion was originally going to be a story-driven cooperative gameplay mode (similar to the "Assault" game type in the 1999 first-person shooter Unreal Tournament), including objectives and obstacles for the two teams. Like the single-player story in the game, this gameplay mode was also going to incorporate humor; for example, in one map, a goal of each team was to find a special watermelon for a mayor in a Moroccan marketplace.Forum post by user "Dan", dated October 30, 2004, 08:21 PM. In:  While this mode was publicly discussed even in July 2000, it is not present as such in the final product (which went gold on October 20). The different objectives were changed to a general goal for both teams in all maps: photographing the other team's intelligence item. However, a number of remnants stemming from the earlier gameplay design can be seen in some of the released maps, such as the office of the aforementioned mayor seen in the Morocco map.Forum post by user "Dan", dated October 31, 2004, 09:00 AM. In:  Fully realized co-operative multiplayer was, however, a feature of No One Lives Forever 2.

TechnologyNo One Lives Forever utilizes the LithTech game engine, which was originally developed by Monolith, and later by its subsidiary, LithTech, Inc. (later known as Touchdown Entertainment). The game is based on LithTech 2.5 (the first game to use this version), with many custom additions and modifications to support the game's design, such as support for vehicles. According to the game's creators, characters in NOLF were built from more polygons than any other PC action game at the time, with Cate Archer's model having approximately 1,700 polygons.

The artificial intelligence (AI) in NOLF was significantly advanced at the time of the game's release. Enemy AI can react to eleven different stimuli, including hearing the player's footsteps or weapon firing, seeing the player's footprints in the snow, or hearing an ally scream in pain. The AI can try and investigate the source of these stimuli, by following the footprints for example, and can sound alarms or call for backup. During combat, the AI finds cover positions, and, to some extent, can also use its environment for protection, such as flipping over a table and hiding behind it. After advancing AI technology in their subsequent games, Monolith likened the way NOLFs AIs pop randomly in and out of cover to a shooting gallery. Groups of AI guards make use of a group logic when investigating and combating the player. For example, one guard might start firing at the player, while another runs and calls for backup. The game's AI includes friendly and enemy humans, as well as dogs, sharks, and helicopters.

Design
Influences and humor

In terms of video games, Monolith drew inspiration from a number of stealth/action games, such as Metal Gear Solid (1998), Tenchu: Stealth Assassins (1998), Syphon Filter (1999), and GoldenEye 007 (1997), because the team was "interested in a blend of stealth and action rather than focusing on one or the other exclusively." The original release of the 1981 stealth game Castle Wolfenstein was also cited as being influential.

Thematically, influences behind The Operative: No One Lives Forever were primarily 1960s spy-themed films, novels, television shows, as well as historical references. When it was decided that NOLF was going to be a 1960s spy game, lead designer Craig Hubbard started immersing himself in the subject matter, in order to "develop some fluency" in it. As he explained, he "was a big fan of early Bond films, but didn't know a lot about the whole spy craze. So I watched the Derek Flint movies , Modesty Blaise, Matt Helm, Danger: Diabolik, Avengers – anything I could get my hands on." Other influences included books, such as The Spy Who Came in from the Cold, TV shows like The Saint, The Pink Panther films, commando movies, such as The Guns of Navarone, as well as "lots of historical references, encompassing everything from books and documentaries on the spy trade to fashion catalogs and interior-design books." The basis for the biological explosives plot was the 1967 film Casino Royale. According to Hubbard, "the idea was to create a game that would make you feel like a superspy, so we tried to come up with situations, characters, and settings to support that goal." During the course of the game, the player can hear explicit popular culture references, including the TV series The Prisoner and The Fugitive, the Matt Helm films The Silencers and The Ambushers, and exotica musicians Les Baxter and Sondi Sodsai. Other conversations allude to major events of the time, such as the studio years of The Beatles, and the commercial failure of the Edsel automobile.

Humor plays an important role in No One Lives Forever. As Hubbard explained, the game's intention is "to make you laugh, but not at the expense of providing a broader, more satisfying emotional experience than a spoof generally allows, so that even if you don't chuckle once, you can still have plenty of fun playing the game. At heart, NOLF is an action/adventure/espionage game with a healthy dose of levity." Humor is presented mainly via visual gags, overheard conversations, textual intelligence items, and cutscenes. The humor includes "situational humor, and even a dash of absurdity and bathroom humor for good measure. Some of it is subtle, some of it isn't." The name of UNITY, H.A.R.M., and other fictional organizations mentioned in the game follow the spy genre formula of using contrived acronyms for organizations (see List of fictional espionage organizations). What H.A.R.M. actually stands for is never revealed, and speculation about its true meaning is used as a running gag in the game's sequel.

Regarding comparisons between the game and the Austin Powers film series, Hubbard pointed out on several occasions that, unlike Austin Powers, No One Lives Forever is not a parody of the spy genre. Contrasting the source of the humor in the two series, Hubbard noted that while the game is "campy and silly,  the underlying premise borders on apocalyptic. That dichotomy in tone results in a very different style of humor from a parody, where everything is in good fun and nobody, including the characters, takes anything very seriously."

Music

The soundtrack for the original version of No One Lives Forever (as well as the later Mac OS X port) was chiefly composed and produced by Guy Whitmore. The game uses DirectMusic technology, and its music is an example of an adaptive score: the music smoothly and flexibly adapts to the situations that players finds themselves in, in order to simulate film soundtracks. For instance, the music increases in tempo or urgency when the player is in a combat situation, or if enemies become aware of the player's presence. Whitmore's task as composer was "to capture the flavor of the '50s/'60s spy genre, without infringing on any existing copyrights." In order to avoid any legal troubles over music from the James Bond franchise of films and games, Whitmore was initially asked to refrain from using brass instruments; a directive he compared to "being asked to produce a blues album without guitars". While some of the instrument sounds came from professional collections, others were home-made samples, including solo cello sounds performed by Lori Goldston, used in the H.A.R.M. theme. Influences for the score included German composer Peter Thomas, the soundtrack of the 1968 film Barbarella, and "an array of Italian composers who did beautiful scores for low budget European erotic films."

Whitmore's adaptive score was not used for the PlayStation 2 version of the game. Instead, it featured original music by Rebecca Kneubuhl, and mixed by Gabriel Mann. The No One Lives Forever theme song was created by Rich Ragsdale. Kneubuhl and Mann also provided vocals for the title theme.

In the Lounge
The game was released with bonus 1960s-inspired music on the second CD. The songs available on this album, titled In the Lounge, were not featured in the game, but were specifically written as extra material. The 9 songs were written by Rebecca Kneubuhl (who created the in-game score for the later PlayStation 2 port as well), and were recorded at Asylum Studios. The CD also features two songs by independent artists: "Void" by Red Delicious and "El Dorado" by Archie Thompson. These were selected for inclusion as part of a NOLF online "music search", organized by Fox Interactive and Indiespace.com.

A different version of In the Lounge was also created. This includes the same 9 original tracks, although in a slightly different order. It does not include the two indie songs; however, it does feature Rich Ragsdale's NOLF title theme, as well as remixes of 6 of the original songs, by Gabriel Mann.

Releases and ports
Original release and Game of the Year EditionThe Operative: No One Lives Forever was originally released for Windows in the United States on November 9, 2000, by Fox Interactive, after it went gold on October 20. Before the game's release, a tech demo was released that included four single player missions, with one being a training mission. After the game's release, another demo was released, dubbed "Mega Mix Demo", which contained four single player levels and two multiplayer maps. A number of patches and map packs had also been made freely available for the game.

After receiving a number of Game of the Year awards, a special Game of the Year Edition was released on October 4, 2001. At this point, Fox Interactive co-published titles with a selection of partners, with the "Game of the Year" edition of the title being co-published by Sierra On-Line. This re-released version includes an exclusive mission otherwise not available in the original game, titled "Rest and Relaxation", which is available after the original story. The GOTY edition comes with the game's official Prima strategy guide, and it also contains more multiplayer maps, which were also made available as a download for owners of the original game.

In 2001, Monolith Productions released a set of editing tools for No One Lives Forever that included the level editor and model editor used for development. The team also released the source code for NOLF (version 1.003 on Windows) that year to "support the fan base by offering the tools to create their own levels".NOLF Team (nolfteam@lith.com) plan file. Monolith Productions. June 20, 2001. Archived at:  It is available both as a download, as well as on the Game of the Year Edition CD-ROM.

PlayStation 2 port
On May 11, 2000, at E3, Fox Interactive announced that No One Lives Forever would be released for the PlayStation 2. although no release date was planned within that time.

On May 2, 2001, Vivendi Universal Interactive Publishing and Fox Interactive signed a co-publishing agreement for four titles, including the PS2 port of No One Lives Forever, all of which would be released under the company's Sierra division. This deal followed an initial January 2001 announcement by Fox where they announced to cease publishing as a standalone unit. The port was initially announced for a Q4 2001 release, but was instead released on April 18, 2002.

The PlayStation 2 version is a port of the "Game of the Year Edition", but includes three exclusive flashback levels not available in other releases of the game titled "Nine Years Ago", in which the player controls a younger Cate Archer, when she used to be a cat burglar. Each of the new levels is accessed during several moments in the original story, when Cate is knocked out by Armstrong. All three levels use new textures, new character models, and feature Cate's cat burglar outfit, as well as two exclusive gadgets. The port does not feature Guy Whitmore's original interactive score; instead, it uses different original music by Rebecca Kneubuhl. Multiplayer mode is not present in this version of the game.

Mac OS X port
A port of No One Lives Forever – Game of the Year Edition for the Mac OS X operating system was developed by MumboJumbo, and published by MacPlay. It was released on November 21, 2002, soon after the original Windows release of No One Lives Forever 2: A Spy in H.A.R.M.'s Way (which was also ported to Mac OS X by MacPlay later). Similarly to the Windows version of the game, the Mac OS X port also uses GameSpy technology for its online multiplayer mode, allowing players to play with each other, no matter which platform they use.

Possible re-release
With the rise of digital distribution of video games in the latter part of the 2000s, there has been speculation about a possible re-release, or even a remake of the titles in the No One Lives Forever series. However, a number of reports have pointed out the complicated state of the series' intellectual property (IP) rights. Even parties that have strong ties to the IP, including video game publisher Activision and NOLF designer Craig Hubbard, have publicly admitted not knowing the precise legal situation of the series, .

In April 2013, Activision community manager Dan Amrich attempted to explain the acquisition history of the No One Lives Forever IP in a public video. This history includes the 2003 acquisition of NOLF publisher Fox Interactive by Vivendi Universal Games (who also owned Sierra Entertainment), as well as the 2008 merger between Vivendi Universal Games (VUG, which had since been renamed Vivendi Games) and video game publisher Activision, forming the Activision Blizzard holding company. After the merger, Activision decided to sell off some IPs and retain others. In order to find out the legal details behind NOLF, Amrich asked his colleagues, saying that "[t]he person that I normally talk to about this stuff does not believe that we [at Activision] currently have the rights. They've never seen it, they've never been given the permission to put that stuff on [GOG.com]. He said, basically, 'If we had it, I would love to be able to reissue those old games.'" Amrich also asked a friend of his who worked at NOLF developer Monolith (since acquired by Warner Bros. Interactive Entertainment), who also did not know who the IP belonged to. Amrich concluded that "at this time I do not believe that Activision has the rights to No One Lives Forever."

When asked about the rights to the game in July 2013, NOLF designer Craig Hubbard also expressed confusion about the legal complexities behind the series. According to Hubbard, "my understanding was that Monolith owned the IP and Fox owned the title of the first game, which was technically The Operative: No One Lives Forever. I think Monolith actually owned A Spy in H.A.R.M.'s Way, the subtitle of the sequel, but I could be wrong about that. Fox got acquired by VUG, which in turn got acquired by Activision, while Monolith got bought by Warner Brothers, so some stars would have to align for everything to get sorted out." Hubbard added that "there didn't seem to be any interest in resurrecting the franchise" as of 2012, while he was still working at Monolith/Warner Bros.

A possible venue for re-release of the games would be computer game sale and distribution service GOG.com. In an interview with GOG.com's Trevor Longino, he said that "NOLF is a really great title, and it's one of the ones where the rights are a bear to get sorted. Just like pretty much any other classic IP you're ever thought of, we’ve looked into it, but it’s not an easy thing to do."

In May 2014, Nightdive Studios, a publisher of classic PC titles, filed trademarks for "No One Lives Forever", "The Operative", "A Spy in H.A.R.M.'s Way", and "Contract J.A.C.K.", Nightdive had also been able to acquire the source code for the games, which would enable them to remaster them for modern computer systems. However, Nightdive had yet to comment on the situation regarding who owned the rights to the game. At this point, the rights to the series were unclear, as the property may have been owned solely or in part by 20th Century Fox (which owned Fox Interactive at the time of the game's release), Activision (which acquired and merged with Vivendi Games, which in turn was the parent to Sierra Entertainment, the publisher of No One Lives Forever 2, and had acquired Fox Interactive in 2003), and Warner Bros. Interactive Entertainment (which acquired Monolith Productions). Warner Bros. did file opposition to Nightdive's trademark, leading Nightdive to try to seek a license arrangement. However, Warner Bros. representatives were concerned that if either Fox or Activision had a part of the ownership, that they would also need their approval. Nightdive attempted to work with Fox and Activision to search their archives, but as these transitions pre-dated computerized records, neither company wanted to do so. Nightdive's efforts were further stalled when they were told by Warner Bros. that they had no interest in partnering or licensing the IP, leading Nightdive to abandon their efforts to acquire the rights.

Reception and legacyNo One Lives Forever received critical acclaim upon its release, and has an 88.34% ranking on the aggregate site GameRankings (based on 28 reviews), and a score of 91 out of 100 on Metacritic (32 reviews). Many reviewers said at the time that No One Lives Forever was among the best first-person shooters since the influential and critically acclaimed 1998 title Half-Life.

In his review, GameSpot's Erik Wolpaw gave No One Lives Forever a score of 9.3 out of 10, and praised the "game's unrelenting inventiveness  shows in virtually every aspect of its design." In IGN's review the game was given a 9.1 overall rating ("Outstanding") out of 10, and was called "one of the best shooters of the year". Eurogamer gave the game a score of 8 out of 10, and called it "thoroughly commendable." Computer Games Magazine gave the game 5 stars out of 5, and claimed that "No One Lives Forever combines a fantastic sense of style with great animation and voice acting, clever AI, industry-leading interactive music, a wry sense of humor, and gameplay that keeps you coming back for more."

Jeff Lundrigan reviewed the PC version of the game for Next Generation, rating it four stars out of five, and stated that "It may not be in quite the same league as Deus Ex, but then, what is? NOLF is one ferociously terrific game. Sequel please."

Critical reception of the PlayStation 2 port of No One Lives Forever was much less positive than the original version. It has a 70.12% ranking on GameRankings (42 reviews), and a score of 67 out of 100 on Metacritic (23 reviews). IGN gave the PlayStation 2 version an overall rating of 6.9 ("Passable") out of 10. The PlayStation 2 port received a 4.6 score ("Poor") out of 10 from GameSpot, and was panned mainly for the lack of the quicksave feature available in the PC version. The Mac OS X version of the game was given a 9.1 rating overall ("Outstanding") by IGN, and was called "a fabulous Mac version of this top notch game."

In the United States, No One Lives Forever sold 36,501 copies by the end of 2000, which accounted for $1.32 million in revenue. The editors of PC Gamer US called these figures "a tragedy, and it's tough to nail a reason." By January 2002, the game's total sales had reached 350,000 copies.

AwardsNo One Lives Forever has earned several Game of the Year awards in the video game press. NOLF was named "Game of the Year" and "Action Game of the Year" by Computer Games Magazine. It also received "Action Game of the Year" awards from Computer Gaming World and PC Gamer magazines. In 2001, the game was nominated by the Academy of Interactive Arts & Sciences for their annual Interactive Achievement Award in the "Game Play Engineering" and "PC Action/Adventure" categories. NOLF was also nominated for the International Game Developers Association's 2001 Game Developers Choice Awards in four categories: Game of the Year, Original Character of the Year, Excellence in Level Design, and Game Spotlight Awards. Out of these, the game earned a Game Spotlight Award for innovation.

Legacy
Retrospective articles written about the game have also been positive. In a 2003 GameSpy feature called "The Top 25 Underrated Games of All Time", No One Lives Forever was ranked as #19, dubbing it and its sequel "two of the most memorable games of the past 10 years." In an article written in 2009 (nine years after the game's release), Eurogamer states that the game has "dated enormously but survives well", and that "you simply couldn't make No One Lives Forever today. You couldn't because it would be too long, require far too many assets, and most significantly of all, risk all the cost of development on a comedy game – a genre that no longer exists." In a 2010 online PC Gamer feature titled "Why you must replay No One Lives Forever", Tim Stone hailed the 10-year-old game's use of humor, and wrote that NOLF "is every bit the amusing, inventive, life-affirming experience I remembered."

Sequel and spin-offThe Operative: No One Lives Forever is the first game in the No One Lives Forever series. It was followed by a sequel in 2002, entitled No One Lives Forever 2: A Spy in H.A.R.M.'s Way. In 2003, a spin-off of the first two games was released, entitled Contract J.A.C.K.. Being a prequel to No One Lives Forever 2, it is chronologically set between the first two No One Lives Forever'' games. This stand-alone expansion pack is a shorter game, and unlike the previous titles, its main protagonist is not Cate Archer, but John Jack, who works for H.A.R.M. The game also focuses more on action gameplay, rather than on stealth.

References

References from the game

External links

 
 The Operative: No One Lives Forever at MobyGames

2000 video games
Cold War video games
Commercial video games with freely available source code
First-person shooters
LithTech games
MacOS games
Monolith Productions games
Fox Interactive games
Multiplayer and single-player video games
Multiplayer online games
PlayStation 2 games
Spy video games
Stealth video games
Video games developed in the United States
Video games featuring female protagonists
Video games scored by Guy Whitmore
Video games set in Berlin
Video games set in Germany
Video games set in Morocco
Video games set in the 1960s
Windows games
James Bond parodies
Video games set in East Germany
MumboJumbo games